Rubus sceleratus is a rare North American species of brambles in the rose family. It has been found only in Coös County in the state of New Hampshire in the northeastern United States.

Rubus sceleratus is a prickly shrub up to 3 meters (10 feet) tall. Leaves are compound with 5 leaflets, green on the upper surface but white underneath because of a thick layer of wool. Fruits are very nearly spherical.

The genetics of Rubus is extremely complex, so that it is difficult to decide on which groups should be recognized as species. There are many rare species with limited ranges such as this. Further study is suggested to clarify the taxonomy.

References

sceleratus
Plants described in 1949
Flora of New Hampshire
Flora without expected TNC conservation status